Detlef Esapa Osong (born 21 September 2004) is an English professional footballer who plays as a forward for Nottingham Forest.

Club career
Esapa Osong joined Nottingham Forest as a youth in 2017 from grassroots football in Leicestershire, and worked his way up their youth sides. He had a prolific start with the club's U18s in the 2022–23 season, scoring 12 goals in 20 appearances to start. He signed his first professional contract with the club on 6 January 2022. He made his professional and senior debut with Nottingham Forest in a 2–0 EFL Cup loss to Manchester United on 1 February 2023.

References

External links
 

2004 births
Living people
English footballers
English people of Cameroonian descent
Association football forwards
Nottingham Forest F.C. players